Ruth Lee (September 14, 1895 – August 3, 1975) was an American stage and film actress.

Early life and career
Lee was born in Minneapolis, Minnesota, and she graduated from a dramatic school there.

Lee acted in stock theater with the National Theatre in Washington, D.C. Her other activities on stage included three years with the Shubert Theater in Minneapolis. She also acted in New York, including performing on Broadway. Her Broadway debut was as a member of the chorus in Apple Blossoms (1919), and her final Broadway role was Muriel Payne in Your Loving Son (1941).

Death
Lee died in Woodland Hills, Los Angeles, California. She was married to the actor Grandon Rhodes.

Partial filmography

 The Rich Are Always with Us (1932) - Second Gossiper in 1920 (uncredited)
 Sued for Libel (1939) - Radio Actress (uncredited)
 The Middleton Family at the New York World's Fair (1939) - Mother
 Not a Ladies' Man (1942) - Jennie Purcell
 Get Hep to Love (1942) - Woman (uncredited)
 Behind the Eight Ball (1942) - Woman (uncredited)
 Shadow of a Doubt (1943) - Mrs. MacCurdy (uncredited)
 Silver Skates (1943) - Mrs. Martin
 Rhythm of the Islands (1943) - Miss Widdicomb
 Good Morning, Judge (1943) - Paula (uncredited)
 Hers to Hold (1943) - Miss Crawford (uncredited)
 Mexican Spitfire's Blessed Event (1943) - Mrs. Fred Walters (uncredited)
 The Adventures of a Rookie (1943) - Mrs. Linden (uncredited)
 Moonlight in Vermont (1943) - Miss Evans
 Tucson Raiders (1944) - Hannah Rogers
 Sensations of 1945 (1944) - Mrs. Gustafson (uncredited)
 The Soul of a Monster (1944) - Woman in Sedan (uncredited)
 Goin' to Town (1944) - Mrs. Wentworth
 The Town Went Wild (1944) - Lucille Conway
 Music for Millions (1944) - Nurse (uncredited)
 Hi, Beautiful (1944) - Mother (uncredited)
 Here Come the Co-Eds (1945) - Miss Holford
 Keep Your Powder Dry (1945) - Classroom Instructor (uncredited)
 The Man Who Walked Alone (1945) - Aunt Harriett
 G. I. Honeymoon (1945) - Mrs. Barton
 Corpus Christi Bandits (1945) - Mom Christie
 I'll Tell the World (1945) - Ethel (uncredited)
 The Naughty Nineties (1945) - (uncredited)
 On Stage Everybody (1945) - Barbara (uncredited)
 Anchors Aweigh (1945) - Kindergarten Teacher (uncredited)
 Mama Loves Papa (1945) - Mabel
 Divorce (1945) - Liz Smith
 Swingin' on a Rainbow (1945) - Landlady (uncredited)
 Week-End at the Waldorf (1945) - The Woman (uncredited)
 Sing Your Way Home (1945) - Bridget's Mother (scenes deleted)
 The Daltons Ride Again (1945) - Mrs. Maggie Bohannon (uncredited)
 Idea Girl (1946) - Abigail Hawthorne
 Swing Parade of 1946 (1946) - Matron (uncredited)
 Partners in Time (1946) - Miss Martha Thurston
 Ding Dong Williams (1946) - Laura Cooper
 Cuban Pete (1946) - Woman on Table (uncredited)
 The Stranger (1946) - Minor Role (uncredited)
 The Dark Horse (1946) - Mrs. Aldrich
 Holiday in Mexico (1946) - (uncredited)
 Sister Kenny (1946) - Mother (uncredited)
 Magnificent Doll (1946) - Mrs. Gallentine (uncredited)
 The Magnificent Rogue (1946) - Lita Andrews
 Monsieur Verdoux (1947) - Gossipy Woman Hanging Clothes (uncredited)
 Dark Delusion (1947) - Nurse (uncredited)
 The Secret Life of Walter Mitty (1947) - Commentator (uncredited)
 Cass Timberlane (1947) - Nurse (uncredited)
 The Judge Steps Out (1948) - Welfare Worker (uncredited)
 Larceny (1948) - Patricia Carson (uncredited)
 Annie Was a Wonder (1949, Short) - Mrs. Nesbitt
 Henry, the Rainmaker (1949) - Schoolteacher
 Cover Up (1949) - Mrs. Abbey
 It Happens Every Spring (1949) - Miss Collins - Prof. Greenleaf's Secretary (uncredited)
 Everybody Does It (1949) - Recital Guest / Party Guest (uncredited)
 The Lady Takes a Sailor (1949) - Miss Brand (uncredited)
 Whirlpool (1950) - Miss Hall (uncredited)
 Your Witness (1950) - Miss Hubert - Heyward's New York Secretary
 Shadow on the Wall (1950) - First Nurse (uncredited)
 The Company She Keeps (1951) - Matron (uncredited)
 Payment on Demand (1951) - Aunt Edna (uncredited)
 Insurance Investigator (1951) - Miss Pringle
 When I Grow Up (1951) - Bully's Mother
 Chain of Circumstance (1951) - Nurse (uncredited)
 As You Were (1951)
 On Dangerous Ground (1951) - Helen (uncredited)
 Young Man with Ideas (1952) - Secretary (uncredited)
 Skirts Ahoy! (1952) - Mrs. Yarbrough (uncredited)
 Crime Wave (1953) - 3rd Police Broadcaster (uncredited)
 The Long, Long Trailer (1954) - Mrs. Tewitt (uncredited)
 Gypsy Colt (1954) - Miss Hartner (uncredited)
 Hell's Outpost (1954) - Mrs. Moffit
 Lucy Gallant (1955) - Hazel (uncredited)
 Terror at Midnight (1956) - Mrs. Lang (uncredited)
 High Society (1956) - Ruth - Jazz Festival Organizer (uncredited)
 These Wilder Years (1956) - Miss Adelaide Finch (uncredited)
 Hot Shots (1956) - Mrs. Morley (uncredited)
 Jet Pilot (1957) - Mother (uncredited)
 Wild Is the Wind (1957) - Party Guest
 Toby Tyler (1960) - Wife in Audience (uncredited)

References

External links
 
 

1895 births
1975 deaths
American film actresses
20th-century American actresses
Actresses from Minneapolis